"The Man Who Ploughed the Sea" is a science fiction short story by British writer Arthur C. Clarke, first published in 1957. The story within a story is narrated by Harry Purvis, who recalls a holiday spent submarining off of the Florida Keys. While there, he happens to witness a meeting between two wealthy and talented scientists, one of whom has designed a method to extract trace elements from seawater. He trades his secret to the other in exchange for the other's fancy yacht, but it turns out that the process is not yet commercially viable.

The piece was later published as the tenth story in Clarke's collection Tales from the White Hart.

References

External links 
 

Short stories by Arthur C. Clarke
1957 short stories
Tales from the White Hart